Pic Carlit (Puig Carlit in Catalan) is a mountain of Pyrénées-Orientales, France. Located in the Pyrenees, it has an elevation of  metres above sea level.

History 
Henry Russell is known to have made the first ascent of the Pic Carlit in 1864, where he was fascinated by the beautiful view of the Étang du Lanoux, the biggest lake of the Pyrénées.

See also
List of French mountains by prominence

References

Mountains of the Pyrenees